Shoemaker is an occupational surname.

People with the name
 Ann Shoemaker (1891–1978), American actress
 Benjamin Shoemaker (1704–c. 1767), mayor of Philadelphia during the 18th century
 Bill Shoemaker (1931–2003), American jockey
 Carolyn S. Shoemaker (1929–2021), astronomer and co-discoverer of Comet Shoemaker-Levy 9
 Charles F. Shoemaker (1841–1913), Commandant from 1895 through 1905 of the United States Revenue Cutter Service
 Christine Shoemaker, American environmental engineer
 Craig Shoemaker (born 1958), American comedian
 Deirdre Shoemaker (born 1971), American physicist
 Dora Adele Shoemaker (1873-1962), American educator, writer
 Douglas Harlow Shoemaker (1905–1985), last Chief Engineer of the Northern Pacific Railway
 Eugene Merle Shoemaker (1928–1997), planetary scientist and co-discoverer of Comet Shoemaker-Levy 9
 Francis Shoemaker (1889–1958), member of the U.S. House of Representatives from Minnesota from 1933 to 1935
 Henry W. Shoemaker (1880–1958), American folklorist, diplomat, and writer
 Jarrod Shoemaker (born 1982), American triathlete
 Jenna Shoemaker (born 1984), American professional triathlete
 John Shoemaker (born 1956), American baseball coach and manager
 Kate Shoemaker (born 1987), American para-equestrian
 Lazarus Denison Shoemaker (1819–1893), member of the U.S. House of Representatives from Pennsylvania during the 1870s
 Matt Shoemaker (born 1986) American baseball player
 Mike Shoemaker (born 1945), politician from Ohio
 Myrl Shoemaker (1913–1985), former lieutenant governor of Ohio and father of Mike Shoemaker
 Robert M. Shoemaker (1924–2017), U.S. Army general
 Sam Shoemaker (1893–1963), American reverend 
 Sydney Shoemaker (1931-2022), American philosopher
 Sylvia Browne (1936–2013), born Sylvia Celeste Shoemaker, American author
 Trina Shoemaker (born 1965), music producer and technician

See also
 Schumaker, a surname
 Schumacher, a surname

English-language surnames
Occupational surnames
English-language occupational surnames